Your Turn, Mr. Moto (originally published under the title No Hero and later as Mr. Moto Takes a Hand) is a 1935 spy novel by John P. Marquand and the debut novel in the Mr. Moto series.

The story was first serialized in the Saturday Evening Post.

The New York Times said Marquand tells his story "superlatively well."

References

External links
 
Complete novel at Project Gutenberg

1935 American novels
Fiction set in 1935
American novels adapted into films
American spy novels
English-language novels